Universitat is a Barcelona Metro station named after Plaça de la Universitat, split between Eixample and Ciutat Vella districts of Barcelona, where the station is located in. This square holds the historical building of Universitat de Barcelona, celebrated for its neo-gothic style. The station is accessible for disabled persons since 1995, when Barcelona Metro line 2 opened its platforms. It is served by TMB-operated Barcelona Metro lines L1 and L2.

Line 1
Barcelona Metro line 1 station was opened on 10 June 1926 as part of the original section of Ferrocarril Metropolità Transversal between the former station of Bordeta and Plaça de Catalunya station. The former metro station was very different from this one and was similar to Urgell and Rocafort metro stations. The metro station was closed between 1971 and 1972 when the new rail link between Sants railway station and Plaça de Catalunya was built, which passes very close to the metro station. This forced to change the original composition of the platforms to two platforms situated one above the other. The current station was opened on 23 December 1972, is located under Plaça de la Universitat and has two levels. The upper level has a large hall that is used by line 2 too and has some commercial areas and a customer office. On the same level there is one of the platforms while the other one is situated on the lower level.

Line 2
Barcelona Metro line 2 station was opened on 25 September 1995 with the opening of the line between Sant Antoni and Sagrada Família metro stations. The station is located under Ronda de Sant Antoni, between Sepúlveda and Aribau streets. On the upper level there is a large hall which is the same for line 1 and it is connected directly with line 1 platform toward Hospital de Bellvitge. There is also an intermediate hall which connects directly with line 1 platform toward Fondo. The trains run on the lower level into two separated naves where each one holds a platform. Line 2 station was built completely adapted for disabled persons.

References

External links
 
 Transports Metropolitans de Barcelona
 Information about line 1 station
 Information about line 2 station
 Trens de Catalunya - Trenscat.com
 Information and photos about line 1 station
 Information and photos about line 2 station
 History, information and antique photos about line 1 station

Railway stations in Spain opened in 1995
Transport in Eixample
Railway stations in Spain opened in 1926
Barcelona Metro line 1 stations
Barcelona Metro line 2 stations